Aoraia senex is a species of moth of the family Hepialidae. It is endemic to New Zealand, where it is known from the South Island. This species was first described by George Vernon Hudson in 1908 from specimens discovered by J. H. Lewis in Central Otago.

The wingspan is 43–50 mm for males. Females are sub-brachypterous with a wingspan of 30–34 mm.  The forewings and hindwings are sparsely scaled and those of the female are narrowed and apically pointed. Adults are on wing from December to February. Adults are day-flying.

References

External links

Citizen science observations

Moths described in 1908
Hepialidae
Moths of New Zealand
Endemic fauna of New Zealand
Taxa named by George Hudson
Endemic moths of New Zealand